Daniel Lynch may refer to:

Sportspeople
 Daniel Lynch (basketball) (1916–1981), athletic director and basketball coach at St. Francis College
 Dan Lynch (born 1962), American college football player and venture capitalist
 Dan Lynch (cricketer) (1854–1920), New Zealand cricketer
 Daniel Lynch (baseball) (born 1996), American baseball pitcher
 Danny Lynch (baseball) (1926–1978), American baseball second baseman

Others
 Dan Lynch, co-developer of TCP/IP, see History of the Berkeley Software Distribution
 Daniel Lynch, convicted for his role in the acid attack on English writer Katie Piper
 Danny Lynch, character in Tara Road